Alois Hanslian (born 1943 in Ennigerloh, Germany) is a German painter.

Biography 
After his graphics and arts study Hanslian was working in Germany and abroad as an Art Director and Illustrator in advertising agencies. Among his work are paintings for galleries and private persons as well as book illustrations. Parallel to it Hanslian is active as a teacher for drawing and creative courses.

Literature 
 Reiki: Universal Life Energy, Bodo J. Baginski, Shalila Sharamon, Alois Hanslian & Chris Baker, LifeRhythm, 
 The Encyclopedia of Tarot Volume IV Stuart Kaplan & Jean Huets, U.S. Games Systems, 
 Die Bachblüten-Devas, Alois Hanslian, Aquamarin-Verlag GmbH, 
 Mama, wo kommen die Kinder her? Oder Die geheimnisvolle Reise des Engels Ananini, Petra Ostergaard & Alois Hanslian, Ostergaard, 
 Die Orchideenblüten-Devas, Alois Hanslian, Aquamarin-Verlag GmbH, 
 Engel-Tarot, Alois Hanslian, Aquamarin-Verlag GmbH, 
 I Ging-Orakel / Die Weisheit des Tao, Alois Hanslian & Maryam Yazdtschi, Aquamarin-Verlag GmbH, 
 Heilung der familiären Blutlinie - Die Arbeit mit dem Hologramm, Theresia Wuttke-Laube & Alois Hanslian, Ostergaard,

References

External links
 Homepage of Alois Hanslian
 Gallery at Artist Rising
 artwork Agentur Walter Holl
 Homepage of Alois Hanslian

20th-century German painters
20th-century German male artists
German male painters
21st-century German painters
21st-century German male artists
1943 births
Living people
20th-century German printmakers